Ramana Tower – is a tower in Ramana village of Baku and dated back to the 12th century. Exact construction date of the tower, which is built of white stone, is not known. It is considered that the tower was built for the purpose of defense and used as a castle during the Shirvanshahs’ reign.

Architectural features
There are two stairs for walking up to the tower walls. It is possible to walk up by spiral stairs from inner side of the tower to a corridor, which was built about  outside of the tower. The other stone stair walks up to the upper side of the tower from the garden. By means of these stairs it is possible to walk up to the tower walls and look at the village. 

Unlike Mardakan Castle, the natural location of Ramana Castle is different; it is on the rocks. The strong tower walls supposedly are a natural continuation of rocky slopes. There is an arch in the eastern wall of the tower.

There is a strong rectangular donjon on the walls of the castle like a donjon of the Mardakan Castle. Entrances standing opposite to each other have a favourable condition of serving for defense. But unlike other towers of Absheron Rayon the entrance with spiral stairs of this castle is not at a height, it is at the level of ground. There are windows for shooting in all walls of the layers. 

Ramana Tower is similar with other towers of Absheron for its plan and architecture. But it differs from them for its more picturesque composition of the architecture. It is because of the relief the tower located on.  The tower hasn't any decorative design and according to style its history is dated back to the 14th century.

In film
Ramana Tower was used as a film location for “Koroghlu”, “Nesimi” and “Babek” films. And the tower was reconstructed during the shooting period of one of “Koroghlu” film, in 1956. Historians mentioned that there was an underground way between Ramana and Maiden Towers. 

A great piece of stone at the left side of the tower reminds about a good event, even if unnoticed at first glance. Eminent Bulbul sang his aria namely near this stone. Residents of the village tell everyone who visits the local historical places and monuments about this stone.

References
 

Castles and fortresses in Azerbaijan
Buildings and structures in Baku
Towers in Azerbaijan
Tourist attractions in Baku
Monuments and memorials in Azerbaijan